Antonio Inutile (born 12 May 1985) is a Finnish retired footballer.

References
Guardian Football
vepsu.fi

1985 births
Living people
Finnish people of Italian descent
People from Järvenpää
Finnish footballers
Helsingin Jalkapalloklubi players
FC KooTeePee players
Vaasan Palloseura players
Lombard-Pápa TFC footballers
Veikkausliiga players
Finnish expatriate footballers
Expatriate footballers in Hungary
Finnish expatriate sportspeople in Hungary
HIFK Fotboll players
FC Honka players
Klubi 04 players
Käpylän Pallo players
Association football midfielders
Association football forwards